The results of the 2010 2nd Tarang Cine Awards, the awards presented annually by the Tarang entertainment television channel to honor artistic and technical excellence in the Oriya language film industry of India ("Ollywood"), are as follow:

Best Film: Sanju Aau Sanjana
Best Director: Sudhansu Sahu
Best Actor: Babusan
Best Actress: Barsha Priyadarshini
Best Actor in a Negative Role: Siddhanta Mahapatra
Best Co-Actor: Mihir Das
Best Co-actress: Ushasi Mishra
Best Actor in a comic role: Pappu
Best Newcomer: Bablu
Best Screenplay: Dilip choudhury
Cinematographer: Sanjeev Mohapatra
Best Male  Playback singer: Krishna Beura
Best female Play back singer: Ira Mohanty
Choreography: Sudhakar Basanta
Lyrics: Devdas Chhotray
Music direction:  Prasanta Padhi
Child Artiste: Sriya

See also
Ollywood films of 2010

References 

2nd Tarang Film Awards
Tarang Cine Awards